The 2012 Dutch Artistic Gymnastics Championships were held from 16-17 June in Rotterdam.

Medalists

References 

Dutch